Mackenzie Aladjem (born September 11, 2001) is an American former child actress. She co-starred in the Showtime series Nurse Jackie as the title character's daughter, Fiona Peyton, for which she won a Young Artist Award. She also appeared in the soap opera All My Children as Miranda Montgomery from 2010 to 2011.

Career
Aladjem has appeared in television shows including Nurse Jackie and All My Children. She has also performed in the national tour of the Broadway stage production of Annie portraying the character Molly. Aladjem has been performing since age four.  She made her film debut in the film The Lincoln Lawyer, based on the book by Michael Connelly.

Filmography

Awards

References

External links

2001 births
Living people
Place of birth missing (living people)
American child actresses
American stage actresses
American television actresses
American soap opera actresses
American musical theatre actresses
American film actresses
21st-century American actresses